North Hollywood station is a combined rapid transit (known locally as a subway) and bus rapid transit (BRT) station in the Los Angeles Metro Rail and Metro Busway systems. It is the northwestern terminus of the B Line subway and eastern terminus of the G Line BRT route. It is located at the intersection of Lankershim Boulevard and Chandler Boulevard in the NoHo Arts District of the North Hollywood neighborhood in the San Fernando Valley of Los Angeles.

History 

North Hollywood station was constructed as part of MOS-3 (Minimum Operating Segment 3), the third and final portion of the Red Line project. The station opened on June 24, 2000, after six years of construction.

As the Metro Rail system was being designed in the 1990s, the initial plan was to build an at-grade and elevated extension of the Metro Red Line west from North Hollywood station along the former Pacific Electric/Southern Pacific Railroad Burbank Branch right of way that Metro acquired in 1991. However, by the time the Red Line reached North Hollywood, political developments stymied these plans: community objections to surface transit along the route resulted in a 1991 law mandating that any rail line along the route be built underground, but a 1998 ballot measure driven by perceptions of mismanagement banned the use of county sales tax to fund subway tunneling.

Prevented from using the right of way for rail, Metro proceeded to build a busway along the corridor, despite further lawsuits from area residents. The line opened on October 29, 2005, with its eastern terminus at North Hollywood.

Lankershim Depot 

The Southern Pacific Railway built the Lankershim Depot in 1896 on land that is adjacent to the current G Line platforms. It later served as a stop on the Pacific Electric system after its North Hollywood Line opened in 1911. In 2014, the station was restored for a cost of $3.6 million, and is currently occupied by a coffee shop.

Development of surrounding area 
Since the opening of the station in 2000, transit-oriented developments have begun to be constructed in the area around the station including thousands of apartments and office buildings. NoHo Tower (a 15-story apartment building) is across the street from the station and NoHo Commons, a multi-use complex which includes several floors of apartments above a level of retail. In September 2007, transportation officials approved NoHo Art Wave. That project did not start due to the recession, but in 2016 a public-private partnership with the Los Angeles County Metropolitan Transportation Authority was proposed on the  surrounding the station.

Service

Station layout 
North Hollywood station is located on two large blocks near the intersection of Lankershim Boulevard and Chandler Boulevard.

The B Line platform is located under Lankershim and the original entrance to the station, under three colorful arched canopies called "Kaleidoscope Dreams," is located on the block east of Lankershim and north of Chandler. This block also contained a large bus plaza and park and ride lot.

The G Line platforms were added about 5 years later, along Chandler and west of Lankershim. For the first 10 years after the opening of the G Line, passengers transferring between the B and G Lines needed to use a crosswalk. Metro constructed a second entrance to the B Line platform on the west side of Lankershim adjacent to the G Line platform in August 2016, easing transfers.

Hours and frequency

Connections 
, the following connections are available:
Burbank Bus: NoHo-Airport (Orange Route) to Burbank Airport
City of Santa Clarita Transit: 757
Greyhound (depot two blocks south of the station at 11239 Magnolia Blvd)
LADOT Commuter Express: 
LADOT DASH: North Hollywood

Notable places nearby 
The station is within walking distance of the following notable places:
Chandler Bikeway – begins adjacent to station and proceeds east to Burbank
Metro Orange Line bicycle path – begins adjacent to station and proceeds west to Chatsworth
Millennium Dance Complex
NoHo Arts District
Historic Lankershim Depot (1896–1952)

Future 
The station is planned as the terminal for two additional Metro Busway lines: the North Hollywood–Pasadena Transit Line which will run to Pasadena with connections to the L Line, and the North San Fernando Valley Transit Corridor which will provide additional east–west services to the Valley.

References

External links 

North Hollywood Station: connections overview
LA Metro – countywide: official website
LA Metro: Orange Line Timetable – schedules
LA Metro: Orange Line map and stations – route map and station addresses and features

B Line (Los Angeles Metro) stations
G Line (Los Angeles Metro)
Los Angeles Metro Busway stations
North Hollywood, Los Angeles
Public transportation in the San Fernando Valley
Public transportation in Los Angeles
Railway stations in the United States opened in 2000
Bus stations in Los Angeles
2000 establishments in California
Pacific Electric stations